Cannibal Killers Live is the first video album by American heavy metal band Static-X. It is the first time the band has released a live album, and contains footage from a live performance in Spokane, Washington. Cannibal Killers Live contains the entire library of the band's officially released videos, and is accompanied by a CD that contains the audio for the Spokane concert.  There was also a special edition of the set which was only attainable through Static-X's website.  The special edition included a third disc containing a concert filmed in Los Angeles, 1997.

Track listing

DVD2 (Music videos)
"Push It"
"I'm with Stupid"
"Bled for Days"
"This Is Not"
"Black and White"
"Cold"
"The Only"
"So"
"I'm the One"
"Dirthouse"
"Destroyer"
"Cannibal"

DVD3 (Live in Los Angeles, 1997)
"I'm with Stupid"
"Down"
"Otsegolation"
"Wisconsin Death Trip"
"I Am"
"Sweat of the Bud"
"Love Dump"
"Push It"

Personnel
 Wayne Static - lead vocals, rhythm guitar, programming
 Koichi Fukuda - lead guitar
 Tony Campos - bass, backing vocals
 Nick Oshiro - drums
 Ken Jay - drums (featured in music videos and the live 1997 footage)
 Tripp Eisen - lead guitar (featured in music videos only)

References

External links
Official trailer at Roadrunner Records

Static-X video albums
2008 live albums
Live video albums
2008 video albums